The Pentecostal Assemblies of Jesus Christ (PAJC) is an independent association of Oneness Pentecostal churches, primarily located in the United States. Historically they have had members across the U.S. and abroad. They were formally organized in 1931. The original headquarters were located in Columbus, Ohio, later moved to St. Louis, Missouri, and then to Cleveland, Ohio. Today they are in Reesville, Ohio.

The PAJC consider themselves to be a continuation of the great revival that began on the day of Pentecost at Jerusalem, AD 33. They believe their doctrines to be founded upon the foundation of the apostles and prophets, Jesus Christ being their chief cornerstone.

History 
The Pentecostal Assemblies of Jesus Christ (PAJC) is one of the oldest active Oneness Pentecostal organizations in the world.  Two of the largest Oneness Pentecostal organizations, United Pentecostal Church International & Pentecostal Assemblies of the World were once part of the Pentecostal Assemblies of Jesus Christ and a third, the International Circle of Faith, traces its roots to the PAJC. All of these groups trace their roots to a revival in 1906 (the Azusa Street Revival) that has become synonymous with the Pentecostal movement. According to Pentecostal historian Morris Golder, in 1931 a unity conference with representatives from four Oneness Pentecostalism organizations met in Columbus, Ohio, in an attempt to bring more Oneness organizations under the same banner. This attempt was partially successful.

The Pentecostal Ministerial Alliance ministers voted to merge with The Apostolic Church of Jesus Christ, but the terms of the proposed merger were not accepted by the ministers of The Apostolic Church of Jesus Christ. Ministers from the Apostolic Church of Jesus Christ and the Pentecostal Assemblies of the World withdrew from their respective organizations and formed a new organization in November 1931. They adopted the name of The Pentecostal Assemblies of Jesus Christ (PAJC) 

In the year of 1945, the PAJC and the Pentecostal Churches Inc. (PCI) merged forming what is now called the United Pentecostal Church (UPCI). According to Pentecostal historian Dr. Bernie L. Wade, in August 1946, a group of brethren became dissatisfied with the merger with the United Pentecostal Church, revived the original charter of the PAJC and reorganized the group. There were a number of reasons for the dissatisfaction but historian Morris Golder believes that the primary issues were related to the treatment of the United Pentecostal Church of black (Negro) ministers.

In the spring of 1948 the Churches of the Lord Jesus Christ met with the brethren of the PAJC and proposal a merger. In August, 1948 the merger became complete. At that time a proposal was issued to the new secretary, J. Frank Wilson, to make an amendment that both charters be dropped. This action was never taken and both charters lay idle until the reviving of the charter came about forming the Assemblies of Jesus Christ.

The old charter of the PAJC again lay idle until the year of 1955. Then a group of ministers led by Bishop Carl Angle (Nashville, Tennessee), Bishop Ray Cornell (Pastor of Apostolic Faith Church of God, Cleveland, Ohio) and Bishop C. B. Gillespie (Fairmont, West Virginia) went to the State of Ohio and took out a charter known as the PAJC, Inc. The PAJC, Inc. is still chartered in the state of Ohio. They believe themselves to be Oneness in doctrine and teachings, and believe that they use only the Bible as their guide book.

The new headquarters was established (using the strength of Bishop Ray O. Cornell's 2500 member Apostolic Faith Church of God) in Cleveland Ohio (established in 1932). Bishop Ray Cornell, Bishop Carl Angle, and Bishop Charles B. Gillespie became the catalyst to the recharter effort.  During the 1950s and 1960s the group's headquarters was at 2050 West 55th Street.  The group grew through an aggressive recruitment effort spearheaded by national evangelist Carl Angle.  It also grew by a number of mergers with other groups who were using the PAJC name.  Most notable is the Southeast PAJC with Bishop J. T. Bass and the PAJC of Knoxville, Iowa where the group's printing presses were housed and publications were printed.

National Directors

Chairmen of the PAJC 

 Bishop Ronald W. Warnock – present
 Bishop R. O. Cornell
 Bishop C. B. Gillespie
 Bishop Carl Angle
 Bishop Thomas Smith

Notable Bishops of the PAJC 

 Bishop Ray O. Cornell
 Bishop C. B. Gillespie
 Bishop Carl E. Angle
 Bishop J. T. Bass
 Bishop Raymond Briggs
 Bishop J. Edgar Hughes
 Bishop George A. Wade
 Bishop George King
 Bishop Arthur Leslie
 Bishop Jesse Minor
 Bishop James A. Lee
 Bishop Marcus Mayle
 Bishop Terrell
 Bishop Wheeler A. Estepp
 Bishop P. Patterson
 Bishop Galen Brown
 Bishop Carlos O. Lewis

Notable People from the PAJC 

 Dr. Johnny Scheel
 Dr. Bernie L. Wade
 Janice Alvear (Taylor)
 Rev. Nathaniel Urshan

Publications 
The Pentecostal Outlook is the official publication of the Pentecostal Assemblies of Jesus Christ, Inc. It has been in publication since 1956.  It is published bi-monthly.

References

http://www.pajci.org

External links
 The Pentecostal Assemblies of Jesus Christ website
 The Association of Religion Data Archives
 The International Circle of Faith
 The Pentecostal Assemblies of the World website
 The United Pentecostal Church International website

Christian organizations established in 1945
Oneness Pentecostal denominations
Pentecostal denominations established in the 20th century